Dorothy West (August 29, 1891 – December 11, 1980) was an American stage and film actress and radio performer.

Early life
She grew up in Huntsville, Alabama.

Career
West was a star in Biograph silent films in New York. She later relocated to Hollywood with a group of D.W. Griffith stars that included Mary Pickford, Marion Leonard, Florence Barker, and Mack Sennett in 1909. West, Pickford, Pickford's brother Jack, and Effie Johnson boarded together.

She joined a stock theatre company in Mount Vernon, Illinois; then joined the Pitt Stock Players in Pittsburgh, Pennsylvania; and in also performed in theatre in Halifax, Nova Scotia.

West returned to film several years later. West received positive notice for her work in Griffith's His Mother's Scarf (1911) Swords and Hearts (1911) and The Eternal Grind (1916).

West left films again to tour in theatre productions in Europe after World War I with the American Army of Occupation, including in Germany.

She also worked on Broadway and with a theatre company called The Triangle Players. She performed in the short play Sintram of Skaggerack by Sada Cowan in 1923.

She made her radio debut in 1928.

Selected filmography

 The Girl and the Outlaw (1908)
 The Guerrilla (1908)
 An Awful Moment (1908)
 One Touch of Nature (1909)
 Love Finds a Way (1909)
 Those Boys! (1909)
 The Girls and Daddy (1909)
 The Brahma Diamond (1909)
 His Wife's Mother (1909)
 The Roue's Heart (1909)
 I Did It (1909)
 The Deception (1909)
 A Burglar's Mistake (1909)
 The Day After (1909)
 The Unchanging Sea (1910)
 In the Border States (1910)
The House with Closed Shutters (1910)
His Mother's Scarf (1911)
Swords and Hearts (1911)
 The Habit of Happiness (1916)
 The Eternal Grind (1916)

References

External links 

American film actresses
American silent film actresses
1891 births
1980 deaths
20th-century American actresses